This Is the Remix is a remix album by American R&B group Destiny's Child. Released in the United States on March 12, 2002 by Columbia Records, the album contains a blend of R&B and dance remixes from the band's previously released three albums Destiny's Child (1998), The Writing's on the Wall (1999) and Survivor (2001) as well as solo material. The album's name is a self-explanatory message taken from the first track "No, No, No Part 2".

Upon its release, the album reached number 19 on the US Top R&B/Hip Hop Albums chart and entered the top thirty of the Billboard 200, while reaching the top ten of the New Zealand Albums Chart. Critical reception was generally positive with Allmusic remarking that "these versions aren't only different; usually, they're better than the originals."

Background
The album is a collection of remixes of Destiny's Child and some bonus tracks. It is notable for containing several resung remixes. The first of these resung remixes "No, No, No (Part II)" is present on this collection. Other major urban remixes that have been resung include "Bootylicious (Rockwilder Remix), "Bug A Boo" (Refugee Camp Remix), "Emotion (Neptunes Remix)", and "Say My Name (Timbaland Remix)", which is even an entirely different composition. The album also collects the "Survivor (Remix)" which features Da Brat.

The album features dance remixes mainly remixed by Maurice Joshua. His remixes on this album include "Bills, Bills, Bills" (Maurice's Xclusive Livegig Mix)", "Nasty Girl (Azza's Nu Soul Mix)", and "So Good (Maurice's Soul Remix)", with the latter having re-recorded vocals. The album also contains a dance/rhythmic remix of "Dot (E-Poppi Mix)" (the original was featured on the "Charlie's Angels Soundtrack"). There is also a remix medley of "Jumpin' Jumpin'" that blends the "So So Def Remix" of the song featuring original members LeToya Luckett and LaTavia Roberson with the "Maurice's Jumpin Retro Mix", which contains vocals by Michelle Williams and Farrah Franklin. The “Refugee Camp Remix” of “Bug a Boo” is an edited version of the remix originally included on its single release, removing all references to former members Luckett and Roberson.

Critical reception

AllMusic editor William Ruhlmann found that "typically, the word 'remix' is far too modest to describe what such knob twiddlers as The Neptunes, Rockwilder, and Timbaland have undertaken. Retaining only the barest bones of the original recordings, if that, they have built wholly new musical tracks [...] and for the most part the results are all to the good [...] These versions aren't only different; usually, they're better than the originals." Sal Cinquemani from Slant Magazine felt that "the collection showcases the R&B trio’s unwavering ability to produce the most contagious of pop hooks and could very well be a premature greatest hits package [...] but the set doesn’t heat up until halfway through track 10 with a trio of club mixes from Maurice Joshua [...] Scam to get your money? Yes. Good fun? Of course."

Tony Naylor from NME called This Is the Remix "a cynical piece of make weight marketing which [we] would get all indignant about, were it not so drearily, predictably average." He found that "Timbaland's version of "Say My Name" is okay, no more, The Neptunes prove, once again, that they only truly sparkle in tandem with Kelis. Only Rockwilder and a non-freakier Missy Elliot really raise their game, turning out an interstellar version of "Bootylicious." Entertainment Weeklys Craig Seymou wrote that "this hits set largely featuring previously released mixes by Missy Elliott, The Neptunes, house guru Maurice Joshua, and others, is too much, too late. These played-to-death cuts are more suited to retirement than reconsideration."

Commercial performance 
The band's third full-length release in less than twelve month, This Is the Remix debuted at number 29 on the US Billboard 200 in the week of March 20, 2002, selling 38,000 copies in its first week of release. By November 2004, the album had sold 249,000 units in the US, according to Nielsen Soundscan.

Track listing

Notes
 denotes co-producer
 denotes vocal producer 
 denotes additional producer
Samples
 "No, No, No Part 2 (Extended Remix)" contains elements of "Strange Games and Things" as written by Barry White.
 "Bug a Boo (Refugee Camp Remix)" contains a sample from "Part Time Suckers" as written by Lawrence Parker.
 "Independent Women Part II" contains elements from "Peabody's Improbable History" as written by Frank Comstock.

Charts

Year-end charts

Certifications

References

Destiny's Child albums
Destiny's Child video albums
Albums produced by Missy Elliott
Albums produced by Timbaland
Albums produced by Jermaine Dupri
Albums produced by the Neptunes
Albums produced by Rockwilder
Albums produced by Wyclef Jean
2002 remix albums
Columbia Records remix albums